Mangifera macrocarpa is a species of plant in the family Anacardiaceae. It is a tree found in Indonesia, Malaysia, Singapore, and Thailand.

References

macrocarpa
Trees of Malesia
Trees of Thailand
Vulnerable plants
Taxonomy articles created by Polbot